Nuno Miguel Pereira Diogo (born 13 June 1981 in Lisbon) is a Portuguese former professional footballer who played as a central defender.

Honours
CFR Cluj
Liga I: 2011–12
Supercupa României: 2010

Notes

References

External links
 
 
 

1981 births
Living people
Footballers from Lisbon
Portuguese footballers
Association football defenders
Primeira Liga players
Liga Portugal 2 players
Segunda Divisão players
Sporting CP B players
Leça F.C. players
S.C. Salgueiros players
F.C. Penafiel players
Leixões S.C. players
S.C. Olhanense players
C.D. Feirense players
F.C. Famalicão players
Liga I players
CS Otopeni players
FC Brașov (1936) players
CFR Cluj players
Portuguese expatriate footballers
Expatriate footballers in Romania
Portuguese expatriate sportspeople in Romania